Rothesay is a civil parish in Kings County, New Brunswick, Canada.

For governance purposes it is divided between the towns of Rothesay and Quispamsis and the local service district of the parish of Rothesay, all of which are members of the Fundy Regional Service Commission (FRSC).

Origin of name
The parish may been named in honour of the Duke of Rothesay, one of the hereditary titles of the Prince of Wales, who visited the area in 1860 as part of his tour of North America.

History
Rothesay was erected from Hampton Parish in 1870.

In 1873 the boundary with Hampton was clarified among the islands of Hammond River and altered to run along grant lines on the mainland.

Boundaries
Rothesay Parish is bounded:

on the northwest by the Kennebecasis River;
on the east by a line running up the Hammond River through its eastern channel, passing to the west of Darlings Island, past the island upriver of Darlings Island, then along grant lines through two islands, then upriver to a point about 675 metres upriver of Route 1, then south-southeasterly along a line about 300 metres west of, and parallel to, the eastern line of a grant to Zephaniah Kingsley to the rear line of the grant, then easterly along the grant line to the northeastern corner of a grant to Samuel Storms, then southeasterly along the eastern line of the Storms grant to the Saint John County line;
on the south by the Saint John County line.

Communities
Communities at least partly within the parish; bold indicates an incorporated municipality

French Village
Quispamsis
Blairs
Gondola Point
Hammond River
Meenans Corner
Otty Glen
Ritchie Lake
Stoneycroft

Rothesay
Barsa Subdivision
East Riverside-Kinghurst
Fairvale
Hillhurst
Kennebecasis Park
Renforth
Upper Golden Grove
Wells

Bodies of water
Bodies of water at least partly in the parish:

Hammond River
Kennebecasis River
Salmon Creek
Allison Lake
Bay Lake
Bradley Lakes

Duck Lake
Hunter Lake
MacFarlane Lake
McKeever Lake
McLachlan Lake
Ritchie Lake

Conservation areas
Parks, historic sites, and related entities in the parish.
Stoneycroft Provincial Historic Site

Demographics
Parish population total does not include Quispamsis and the town of Rothesay

Population
Population trend

Language
Mother tongue (2016)

Access Routes
Highways and numbered routes that run through the parish, including external routes that start or finish at the parish limits:

Highways

Principal Routes

Secondary Routes:

External Routes:
None

See also
List of parishes in New Brunswick

Notes

References

External links
 Town of Quispamsis
 Town of Rothesay

Local service districts of Kings County, New Brunswick
Parishes of Kings County, New Brunswick